The TVR Speed Six was the name of a naturally aspirated straight-6 engine manufactured by TVR, and used in several of their cars including the Tuscan, Cerbera, Tamora, T350, Sagaris and Typhon. 

The engine's prototypes (referred to as AJP-6) were designed and delivered by independent engineer Al Melling (the "A" in AJP) as both 3.0 and 3.5 litre units. Many of its key cylinder head design elements (particularly the valvetrain) were first seen in the 1991 Suzuki GSX-R750 (M) motorcycle engine (also a Melling design).

The key design features were an all aluminium alloy block and head, with cast iron cylinder liners, double overhead camshafts, finger follower 24-valve actuation, one throttle and injector per cylinder (throttle-body fuel injection), equal length tubular exhaust manifolds dual 3-way catalytic converters and a dry sump lubrication system allowing the engine to be mounted lower in the vehicle chassis. These features enabled the engine to provide lightweight, compact dimensions, extremely fast throttle response and high peak horsepower.  

Worthy of note is that the high performance BMW S54 engine is also of a very similar configuration. Straight-6, throttle body EFI, DOHC 24-valve finger follower valve actuation.

Prominent modifications were alterations to valve train geometry, a switch from a billet steel crank to cast iron (with a crank damper), different connecting rods, oil filter relocation to the inlet side of the engine, and removal of the exhaust cam oil feed. The two different capacities were achieved through stroke alterations from a con-rod design able to accommodate two different stroke lengths, and different piston crown designs altering the compression ratios. The bore diameters were shared. Pistons were made in Italy by Asso Werke from pre-existing casts, initially designed for the Rotax-Aprilia RSV 1000 engine. Those casts, refused by Rotax, were modified and used to produce the smaller Speed Six pistons.

Unfortunately, during TVR’s development of the original MCD design, it was decided to remove the drilled lubrication oil-ways from the camshaft centres to the peak of each of the camshaft lobes, resulting in starvation of lubrication and early versions of the Speed Six engine suffering from poor valve-train durability leading to many warranty claims against TVR. 

German and French tuners and owners have, since, re-introduced these oil-ways, returning the motor to its original, efficient and reliable design. 

Other third party development work has also mitigated this issue by using revised material harnesses for the cam lobes, finger followers and valve guides. Softer valve springs and valves with thicker stems were also utilised. Engines that have had these modifications performed have also improved durability.

TVR further developed the Speed Six into the limited-production V12 Speed Twelve racing engine. TVR also experimented with supercharging the Speed Six engine for use in the Typhon/T440 model. However this proved unsuccessful due to cooling challenges so the few Typhon/T440 models that made production were instead fitted with standard naturally aspirated 4.0L Speed Six engines.

References

TVR engines
Straight-six engines